This is a list of Villages in the Kherson Oblast (Region) of Ukraine categorised by Raion.

Beryslav Raion 

 Andriivka
 Bilohirka
 Bilyayivka
 Borozenske
 Bruskynske
 Burhunka
 Davydiv Brid
 Dobryanka
 Dudchany
 Havrylivka
 Khreshchenivka
 Kostromka
 Liubymivka
 Lozove
 Mylove
 Myroliubivka
 Novohrednyeve
 Novooleksandrivka
 Novopetrivka
 Novoraisk
 Novovoznesenske
 Olhyne
 Osokorivka
 Petropavlivka
 Sukhyi Stavok
 Trudolyubivka
 Tryfonivka
 Tyahynka
 Ukrainka
 Vysoke
 Zelenyi Hai
 Zmitivka
 Zolota Balka

Henichesk Raion 

 Chonhar
 Henicheska Hirka
 Hornostaivka
 Shchaslyvtseve
 Sokolohirne
 Strillkove
 Syvash
 Zelenyi Hai

Kakhovka Raion 

 Hryhorivka
 Khrestivka
 Kostiantynivka
 Rubanivka
 Tavrychanka
 Zelenyi Pid

Kherson Raion 

 Barvinok
 Blahodatne
 Chornobaivka
 Darivka
 Inhulivka
 Kyselivka
 Muzykivka
 Oleksandrivka
 Pody
 Posad-Pokrovske
 Pravdyne
 Sahy
 Soldatske
 Solontsi
 Stanislav
 Tavriyske
 Yuvileine
 Zelenyi Hai

Skadovsk Raion 

 Bilenke
 Chulakivka
 Hladkivka
 Zaliznyi Port

Villages in Kherson Oblast
Kherson